CKMO-FM (101.5 FM, FM 101 Orangeville) is a radio station licensed to Orangeville, Ontario. Owned by Local Radio Lab, it broadcasts an adult contemporary format. Its studios are located on Mill Street in downtown Orangeville.

CKMO-FM is the only Orangeville-based station to specifically target Orangeville; the town's only other licensed radio station, CIDC-FM, is marketed towards the entirety of the Greater Toronto Area.

History
My Broadcasting previously submitted an application for the station in 2012 at the same frequency and parameters, but the application was soon withdrawn.

On November 6, 2014 at 11:12am, CKMO-FM began on air testing with Christmas music on 101.5 MHz. In late December 2014, 101.5 FM switched from Christmas music to air 10,000 songs in a row.

On the morning of February 17, 2015, CKMO-FM  launched its regular programming, followed by a ribbon-cutting ceremony at noon with Mayor Jeremy Williams, Councillor Nick Garisto, and CKMO-FM General Manager Gail James.

On June 25, 2021, the CRTC approved the sale of CKMO and its sister stations CIMA-FM/Alliston and CJML-FM/Milton to Local Radio Lab, a new company owned by former Haliburton Broadcasting Group owner Christopher Grossman.

Historical use of CKMO call sign
From 1928 to 1955, the call letters CKMO were used at a pioneer radio station in Vancouver, British Columbia. On February 1, 1992, CKOC in Hamilton, Ontario dropped its historical call letters and adopted CKMO. However, after a few months the Hamilton station changed owners, and the CKOC call sign was restored. In 1993, CKMO became available for a radio station in Victoria, British Columbia, until 2012.

References

External links
FM 101 Orangeville
 

Orangeville, Ontario
KMO
KMO
Radio stations established in 2015
2015 establishments in Ontario
KMO